Godoy is a French surname coming from the Normandy region in France. It is derived from the Norman-French first name Gaudi meaning ruler. It is also a Spanish surname. It may refer to:

Adán Godoy (born 1936), Chilean football player
Aníbal Godoy (born 1990), Panamanian football player
Anna Godoy (born 1992), Spanish triathlete
Arturo Godoy (1912–1986), Chilean boxer
Benedicto Godoy (born 1924), Bolivian football player 
Caio Godoy (born 1995), Brazilian road cyclist and triathlete 
Carmen Rico Godoy (1939–2001), Spanish writer, journalist and feminist
Dagoberto Godoy (1893–1960), Chilean pilot, first person to fly over the Andes
Daniel Godoy (born 1981), Venezuelan football player
David Godoy Bugueño (1944–2007), Chilean chess master
Diego Godoy (born 1992), Paraguayan football player
Enrique Godoy Sayán (1902–1984), Cuban business magnate and banker.
Eric Godoy (born 1987), Chilean football player
Érik Godoy (born 1993), Argentine football player
Fanny Godoy (born 1998), Paraguayan football player
Flávio Godoy (born 1969), Brazilian athlete
Francesc Godoy (born 1986), Spanish triathlete
Franco Godoy (born 2000), Argentine football player
Gian Godoy (born 1966), Chilean filmmaker, architect and artist
Gilberto Godoy Filho (born 1976), Brazilian volleyball player, better known as Giba
Gina Godoy (born 1962), Ecuadorian politician
Gonzalo Godoy (born 1988), Uruguayan football player
Hernán Godoy (born 1941), Chilean football player and manager
Huber Godoy (born 1998), Cuban artistic gymnast
Isabel Godoy (born 1967), Chilean activist and politician
Joaquin Godoy (1927–2013), Cuban rower
Jorge Godoy (born 1946), Argentine admiral, Chief of staff of the Argentine Navy 2003-2011
Jorge Godoy Cárdenas (born 1954), Mexican politician 
José Godoy (born 1994), Venezuelan baseball player
José Carlos Godoy (1911–1988), Peruvian basketball player, brother of Miguel Godoy (basketball)
Juan Godoy (1800–1842), Chilean miner whose discovery of a silver outcrop sparked the Chilean silver rush
Juan Esteban Godoy (born 1982), Paraguayan football player
Julio César Godoy Toscano (born 1965), Mexican businessman, politician and fugitive
Kenny Godoy, Honduran judoka
Laura Godoy (born 1988), Guatemalan volleyball player, model and beauty pageant titleholder
Leandro Godoy (born 1994), Argentine football player
Leonardo Godoy (born 1995), Argentine football player
Leonel Godoy Rangel (born 1950), Mexican politician
Lucas Godoy (born 1982), Argentine politician
Lucila Godoy Alcayaga (1889–1957), known by her pseudonym Gabriela Mistral, Chilean poet, diplomat, educator and humanist
Lucio Godoy (born 1958), Spanish-Argentine film composer and music producer
Luis Godoy (boxer) (born 1952), Colombian boxer
Luis Godoy (footballer) (born 1978), Chilean football player
Manuel Godoy (1767–1851), Prime Minister of Spain from 1792-97 and 1801-08
Manuel de Godoy, 2nd Prince di Bassano (1805–1871), Spanish aristocrat, son of Manuel Godoy
Matilde de Godoy di Bassano, 4th Countess of Castillo Fiel (1830–1901), Spanish-Italian aristocrat, daughter of Manuel Godoy, 2nd Prince di Bassano
Josefa de Godoy di Bassano, 2nd Viscountess of Rocafuerte (1834–1882), Spanish-Italian aristocrat, daughter of Manuel Godoy, 2nd Prince di Bassano
Manuel de Godoy di Bassano, 3rd Prince Godoy di Bassano (1835–1896), Spanish-Italian aristocrat, son of Manuel Godoy, 2nd Prince di Bassano
Maria Aparecida Godoy (born 1945), also known as Cida Godoy, Brazilian writer and comic artist 
María Luisa Godoy (born 1980), Chilean journalist and presenter
Matías Godoy (born 2002), Argentine football player
Mauricio Godoy (born 1997), Chilean football player
Mercedes Godoy (1890–1932), Mexican socialite in the United States, author and singer
Miguel Godoy (footballer) (born 1983), Paraguayan footballer
Miguel Godoy (basketball) (1907–2002), Peruvian basketball player, brother of José Carlos Godoy
Mónica Godoy (born 1976), Chilean actress
Pablo Godoy (born 1984), Paraguayan football player and manager
Pedro de Godoy (1599–1677), Spanish catholic bishop and theologian
Philippe Godoy (born 1971), French football player
Rafael Godoy (1907–1973), Colombian composer
Rodrigo Godoy (born 1989), Argentine football player
Rosa Godoy (born 1982), Argentine long-distance runner
Santiago Godoy (born 2001), Argentine football player
Scarlett O'Phelan Godoy (born 1951), Peruvian historian and professor
Sergio Godoy (Argentine cyclist) (born 1988)
Sergio Godoy (Guatemalan cyclist) (born 1973)
Tomás Godoy Cruz (1791–1852), Argentine statesman and businessman
Virgilio Godoy (1934–2016), Nicaraguan politician
Yonder Godoy (born 1993), Venezuelan racing cyclist

See also 
 Godøy, an island in Giske kommune at the west coast of Norway
 Godoi (disambiguation)
 Godoy Cruz (disambiguation)
 Joaquim Floriano de Godóy (1826–1907), Brazilian doctor and politician
 Palace of Marqués de Grimaldi, or Palacio de Godoy (Spanish for Godoy Palace)

References 

Spanish-language surnames